The Bishop to the Australian Defence Force is the chair of the Defence Force Board of the Anglican Church of Australia. The Board assists the Church in relation to all matters concerned with its ministrations among men and women of the Australian Defence Force and the families of those men and women.

List of Bishops to the Australian Defence Force
See also
Bishop to the Forces

References

External links
 – official site

 
Lists of Anglican bishops and archbishops
Anglican bishops to the Australian Defence Force